Shanker Shesh was an Indian playwright, author, poet and story writer.

Biography
Shanker was born on 2 October 1933 in Bilaspur, Central Provinces and Berar, British India. He did his higher education in Nagpur and Mumbai. He got his Ph.D. from Nagpur University in 1964.

Shesh was associated with theatre from 1956 and remained associated throughout his life. While being appointed as the Chief Hindi Officer of State Bank of India in Mumbai, he continued to do playwriting and other creative work. He was also fluent in Marathi Language and also translated some marathi plays in hindi.

Shesh died on 28 October 1981 in Srinagar, Jammu & Kashmir.

Work

Films

Plays

Awards and honors

Shesh was honored with the Aashirwaad Award by the government of Madhya Pradesh for his plays Gharaonda and Dooriyaan.

References

External links
 

Indian dramatists and playwrights
1933 births
Year of death missing